Paul Joseph Christiansen (July 31, 1914 – December 5, 1997) was an American choral conductor and composer. As the youngest son of F. Melius Christiansen, he was brought up into the Lutheran Choral Tradition and quickly developed his own style of conducting and composing that furthered the tradition started by his father.  He spent the bulk of his career developing The Concordia Choir and conducted the choir from 1937-1986.  He is also credited with establishing the Concordia Christmas Concert which is seen yearly by more than 30,000 people.

Paul J. Christiansen died December 5, 1997, at his Moorhead, Minnesota home, of amyotrophic lateral sclerosis (AML Lou Gehrig's disease). He was 83 years old at the time of his death.

Selected compositions and arrangements

Gracious Spirit
This Little Light
Pilgrim's Chorus
Wondrous Love
Lift Up Your Heads
Brothers
My Song in the Night
The King of Love
Prayers of Steel
Christmas Procession
Vidi Aquam
And God Shall
Create in Me a Clean Heart O God
Jesus, Jesus Rest Your Head
Now All Poor
Tree of Glory
While Angels Sing
Kyrie Eleison
This is My Father's World
Easter Carol
Winds Through The Olive Trees
Cindy
Swing Low, Sweet Chariot
The Last Spring
Mary Sat Spinning
"David's Prayer (from Psalm 39)"

Legacy

Paul J. Christiansen's development of The Concordia Choir has left a lasting impact, not only on Concordia College, Moorhead, but on modern American choral music. Some of his most distinguished students have been his son Erik Christiansen (Choral conductor at Stillwater Area High School), Gregory Aune (conductor of The Gustavus Choir), Maurice Skones (Director of The Choir of the West and Director of Choral Activities and Professor Emeritus for University of Arizona), Larry L. Fleming (founder of the National Lutheran Choir), Bruce Phelps (founder and conductor of the Two Rivers Chorale & the Northern Lights Chorale), Richard D. Hoffland (Milliken University), Phyllis Bryn-Julson, operatic soprano and pedagogue, Daniel T. Moe (Director of Choral Organizations for the University of Iowa, professor of choral conducting at Oberlin College Conservatory of Music), Phil Mattson (jazz arranger and music director), Phyllis E. Zimmerman (composer and Director of Canticle A Cappella Choir), Kathryn Huselid (Retired Choral Director from Atwater Cosmos Grove City High School and 1995 MMEA Choral Educator of the Year), Arlene Buckneberg Ydstie (choir director and composer), and Bruce Houglum (Conductor of the Concordia Orchestra).

References

References and external links
https://web.archive.org/web/20110720133018/http://discovery.mnhs.org/MN150/index.php?title=Paul_J._Christiansen
http://www.luthersem.edu/word&world/archives/12-3_music/12-3_armstrong.pdf
http://www.arcasearch.com/us/mn/
https://web.archive.org/web/20071101000553/http://www.cord.edu/Music/Christmas/history.php
http://www.a-cappella.com/product/4811/classical_mixd_groups
http://www.concordiarecordings.com/Merchant2/merchant.mvc?Screen=PROD&Store_Code=CR&Product_Code=3723
http://www.cord.edu/Music/Ensembles/Orchestras/Orchestra/conductor.php
https://web.archive.org/web/20081203005834/http://www.plu.edu/~choir/history.html
http://gustavus.edu/profiles/gaune/
"50 Years With Paul J. Christiansen" produced by Concordia Recordings, Moorhead, MN
Concordia College Department of Music, Sheldon Green

1914 births
1997 deaths
American male composers
American choral conductors
American male conductors (music)
20th-century American conductors (music)
20th-century American composers
20th-century American male musicians